James Anderson (1825 – 14 March 1899) was a Tyneside miner/songwriter of the late 19th century. He was quite famous locally at the time, and his most popular song is probably "Aw wish Pay Friday wad cum".

Details
Mr James Anderson was born in 1825 in Earsdon and followed his father into the coal mines. At one stage he was "lamp-man" at Elswick Colliery, a position which he held for 20 years.

His songs won many prizes in the local competitions, such as the one held by John W Chater and those run by the Weekly Chronicle. He had much of his material published in 'Chater's Tyneside Comic Annuals' and other publications.

It would appear that at the time of his writings, James Anderson was as well known and popular as Joe Wilson, although his popularity has not endured anywhere near as much.

His song "Aw wish Pay Friday wad cum" was awarded first prize in the Weekly Chronicle song competition of 1870, beating some 176 competitors including Joe Wilson's entry of "Wor Geordy's Local Hist'ry". After the publication of the song the author became known as 'Pay Friday Jim'

John Fraser, the local printer, stationer, bookbinder, newsagent, writer and publisher (of, among other things, The Blyth & Tyneside Comic Almanack), published in 1898 a collection of James' Anderson's songs and poems entitled  "Collection of Blyth and Tyneside Poems & Songs”

James Anderson died after a long illness at his home in Cowpen Quay, Blyth on 14 March 1899, he was 73.

Works 
These include :-
 Collection
 Collection of Blyth and Tyneside Poems & Songs" written by James Anderson printed by J. Fraser [pref., 1898 (126 pages)
 Individual songs/poems
 Aa wunder what canny aad Blyth 'll say noo
 Another Song in answer to James Armstrong
 At Heddon-on-the-Wall
 Aud Billy Henderson's wonderful coat, sung to the tune of Cappy's, the Dog
 Aw wish pay Friday wad cum, sung to the tune of Aw wish yor muther wud cum. This song was awarded first prize in the Newcastle Weekly Chronicle song competition of 1870, beating some 176 competitors including Joe Wilson. After the publication of the song the author became known as "Pay Friday Jim"
 Aw wish that time wad cum, sung to the tune of John Anderson, my Joe
 Aw'll buy ne mair butter o' Paddison's wife, sung to the tune of Laird o' Cockpen
 Aw'll nivor gan drinkin' i' Blyth onny mair, sung to the tune of Laird o' Cockpen
 Be kind te yer wife
 Blyth sailor's farewell, sung to the tune of Laird o' Cockpen.
 Bonny banks of o' Tyne
 Bonny bright eyed Mary
 Bonny Throckley Fell
 Clocks at the Central Station – (The)
 Four Seasons – (The)
 Friendship's Smile
 Half the lees they tell isn't true
 High price o' coals; or, Peggy's lament
 Honest workin' man
 Jack an' Nan
 Jennie and Jemmie, a parody on the song 'When ye gang awa, Jemmie'
 John Bryson, the Miners' Best Friend
 Late Mr James Bonner – (The)
 Local Poet's Lament for Jos Chater – (The)
 Man, know Thyself
 Mary on the Banks of Tyne
 Me fethur's drunk ag'yen – appeared in John W Chater's Canny Newcassel Diary and Remembrancer
 Miseries of man
 Music
 My little favourite Pink Flower
 My Residence in Blyth
 My Sweet Little Home by the Sea
 Northumberland miners' strike, 1876
 Rural Retreat – (A)
 Sally and Bobby, sung to the tune of Cappy's, the Dog
 Sally and Sam
 Smiling Face – (A)
 Thor's queer folks noo o' days
 Toast, On taking a friendly Glass of Beer – (A), awarded first prize in a competition.
 Tortoise-shell tom cat
 Town of Old Hexham – (The)
 True Manhood
 Walbottle Dene, sung to the tune of John Anderson, my Joe
 Warm fireside (A) – appeared in John W Chater's Canny Newcassel Diary and Remembrancer
 What did aw get married for?, sung to the tune of Green grows the rashes o
 What is Love
 Wor Bonny Pit Lad

See also 
Geordie dialect words
John W Chater
Chater's Canny Newcassel Diary and Remembrancer 1872

References

External links
 FARNE archives – cover of Collection of Blyth and Tyneside Poems & Songs
 Elswick Colliery
Elswick
Allan’s Illustrated Edition of Tyneside songs and readings

English male poets
English songwriters
People from Newcastle upon Tyne (district)
Musicians from Tyne and Wear
1825 births
Geordie songwriters
1899 deaths